Transcription factor AP-2 epsilon (activating enhancer binding protein 2 epsilon), also known as TFAP2E, is a human gene. The protein encoded by this gene is a transcription factor.

See also
 Activating protein 2

References

External links
 

Transcription factors